740 Cantabia is a minor planet orbiting the Sun. It was discovered on 10 February 1913 at Winchester, Massachusetts by American amateur astronomer J. H. Metcalf. Cantabia is a contraction of Cantabrigia, Latin for Cambridge, named in honor of Cambridge, Massachusetts. Between 2014 and 2021, 740 Cantabia has been observed to occult three stars.

This asteroid shows an exceptionally slow rate of spin. The spectrum is classified as type CX in the Tholen taxonomy. It spans a girth estimated at ~91 km.

See also 
 List of minor planets/701–800
 Meanings of minor planet names: 501–1000

References

External links 
 Lightcurve plot of 740 Cantabia, Palmer Divide Observatory, B. D. Warner (2009)
 Asteroid Lightcurve Database (LCDB), query form (info )
 Dictionary of Minor Planet Names, Google books
 Asteroids and comets rotation curves, CdR – Observatoire de Genève, Raoul Behrend
 Discovery Circumstances: Numbered Minor Planets (1)-(5000) – Minor Planet Center
 
 

Background asteroids
Cantabia
Cantabia
CX-type asteroids (Tholen)
19130210